Twist with the Ventures is the fifth studio album by the band The Ventures; released in 1962 on Dolton Records BST 8010 (stereo) and BLP 2010 (monaural).  It consists mostly of instrumental versions of popular dance tunes from the late 1950s to early 1960s, with a couple of original compositions. It was on the charts for 29 weeks and it peaked at # 24 on the Billboard 200. It was later retitled Dance! with new album cover. During the recording of this album, original drummer Howie Johnson left the band and was replaced by Mel Taylor, thus forming the classic Ventures lineup.  Therefore, the drum credit(s) are shared on this album between both Johnson and Taylor.

Track listing
Side one
"Ventures Twist" (Bob Bogle, Nokie Edwards, Don Wilson) – 1:59 
 "The Twist" (Hank Ballard) – 1:52
"Road Runner" (Rick Dangel, John Greek) – 2:42
"Gringo" (Gene Moles) – 2:30
"Moon Dawg" (Derry Weaver) – 2:21
"Guitar Twist" (Dick Glasser, Tommy Allsup) – 2:19

Side two
"Opus Twist" (Jerry Allison, Tommy Allsup) – 2:00
"Movin' And Groovin'" (Duane Eddy, Lee Hazlewood) – 2:04   
"Sunny River" (Moles, Edwards) – 2:08
"Let's Twist Again" (Dave Appell, Kal Mann) – 2:15
"Shanghied" (Greek, Dangel) – 1:50
"Bumble Bee Twist" (Wilson, Edwards, Bogle) – 2:19

This is the track listing from the original album.  On later releases, "Ventures Twist" was retitled "Driving Guitars", "Guitar Twist" was retitled "Raunchy Guitar", "Opus Twist" was retitled "Opus Four", and "Bumble Bee Twist" was retitled "The Wasp".

Personnel
Don Wilson – rhythm and lead guitar
Nokie Edwards – lead guitar 
Bob Bogle – bass, lead guitar
Mel Taylor – drums
Howie Johnson – drums
Tommy Allsup - lead guitar (tracks Sd 1-6, Sd 2-1)

References

1962 albums
Dolton Records albums
The Ventures albums
Instrumental albums